The 2022 FC Cincinnati season is the club's fourth season in MLS, and the seventh season of a team playing under the FC Cincinnati brand after three years in the lower-division USL Championship. The club finished with a league worst 4–22–8 record in their third MLS season in 2021. FC Cincinnati home matches will be played at TQL Stadium.

FC Cincinnati's offseason transfers were initially executed by general manager Chris Albright. On December 14, 2021, Pat Noonan was hired as head coach.

Club

Roster

Player movement

In

Out

Loans in

Loans out

2022 MLS SuperDraft picks

Competitions

Preseason

Major League Soccer

League tables

Eastern Conference

Overall

Results

MLS Cup Playoffs

U.S. Open Cup

Leagues Cup

Statistics

Appearances and goals 
Numbers after plus-sign(+) denote appearances as a substitute.

|-
! colspan=16 style=background:#dcdcdc; text-align:center|Goalkeepers

|-
! colspan=16 style=background:#dcdcdc; text-align:center|Defenders

|-
! colspan=16 style=background:#dcdcdc; text-align:center|Midfielders

|-
! colspan=16 style=background:#dcdcdc; text-align:center|Forwards

|-
! colspan=16 style=background:#dcdcdc; text-align:center|Players who have played for FC Cincinnati this season but have left the club:

Top scorers 
{| class="wikitable" style="font-size: 100%; text-align: center;"
|-
! style="background:#003087; color:#FFFFFF; border:2px solid #FE5000; width:35px;" scope="col"|Rank
! style="background:#003087; color:#FFFFFF; border:2px solid #FE5000; width:35px;" scope="col"|Position
! style="background:#003087; color:#FFFFFF; border:2px solid #FE5000; width:35px;" scope="col"|No.
! style="background:#003087; color:#FFFFFF; border:2px solid #FE5000; width:140px;" scope="col"|Name
! style="background:#003087; color:#FFFFFF; border:2px solid #FE5000; width:75px;" scope="col"|
! style="background:#003087; color:#FFFFFF; border:2px solid #FE5000; width:75px;" scope="col"|
! style="background:#003087; color:#FFFFFF; border:2px solid #FE5000; width:75px;" scope="col"|
! style="background:#003087; color:#FFFFFF; border:2px solid #FE5000; width:75px;" scope="col"|Total
|-
| 1 || FW || 19 || align=left| Brandon Vazquez || 18 || 1 || 0 || 19
|-
| 2 || FW || 9 || align=left| Brenner || 18 || 0 || 0 || 18
|-
| 3 || MF || 10 || align=left| Luciano Acosta || 10 || 1 || 0 || 11
|-
| 4 || MF || 31 || align=left| Álvaro Barreal || 5 || 0 || 3 || 8
|-
| rowspan="2"|5 || DF || 21 || align=left| Matt Miazga || 2 || 0 || 0 || 2
|-
| MF || 93 || align=left| Júnior Moreno || 2 || 0 || 0 || 2
|-
| rowspan="5"|7 || DF || 4 || align=left| Nick Hagglund || 1 || 0 || 0 || 1
|-
| MF || 7 ||  align=left| Yuya Kubo || 1 || 0 || 0 || 1
|-
| MF || 12 ||  align=left| Calvin Harris || 1 || 0 || 0 || 1
|-
| DF || 22 || align=left| Rónald Matarrita || 1 || 0 || 0 || 1
|-
| MF || 32 || align=left| Ian Murphy || 1 || 0 || 0 || 1
|-
!colspan="4"|Total
!64!!2!!3!!69

Top assists 
{| class="wikitable" style="font-size: 100%; text-align: center;"
|-
! style="background:#003087; color:#FFFFFF; border:2px solid #FE5000; width:35px;" scope="col"|Rank
! style="background:#003087; color:#FFFFFF; border:2px solid #FE5000; width:35px;" scope="col"|Position
! style="background:#003087; color:#FFFFFF; border:2px solid #FE5000; width:35px;" scope="col"|No.
! style="background:#003087; color:#FFFFFF; border:2px solid #FE5000; width:160px;" scope="col"|Name
! style="background:#003087; color:#FFFFFF; border:2px solid #FE5000; width:75px;" scope="col"|
! style="background:#003087; color:#FFFFFF; border:2px solid #FE5000; width:75px;" scope="col"|
! style="background:#003087; color:#FFFFFF; border:2px solid #FE5000; width:75px;" scope="col"|
! style="background:#003087; color:#FFFFFF; border:2px solid #FE5000; width:75px;" scope="col"|Total
|-
| 1 || MF || 10 || align=left| Luciano Acosta || 19 || 0 || 0 || 19
|-
| 2 || MF || 31 || align=left| Álvaro Barreal || 9 || 0 || 0 || 9
|-
| 3 || FW  || 19 || align=left| Brandon Vazquez || 8 || 0 || 0 || 8
|-
| 4 || FW  || 9 ||  align=left| Brenner || 6 || 0 || 0 || 6
|-
| rowspan="2"|5 || DF || 2 || align=left| Alvas Powell || 3 || 0 || 1 || 4
|-
| MF || 7 || align=left| Yuya Kubo || 4 || 0 || 0 || 4
|-
| rowspan="2"|7 || MF || 5 || align=left| Obinna Nwobodo || 2 || 1 || 0 || 3
|-
| DF || 22 || align=left| Rónald Matarrita || 3 || 0 || 0 || 3
|-
| rowspan="5"|9 || DF || 3 || align=left| John Nelson || 2 || 0 || 0 || 2 
|-
| DF || 4 || align=left| Nick Hagglund || 2 || 0 || 0 || 2
|-
| MF || 6 || align=left| Haris Medunjanin || 1 || 0 || 1 || 2
|-
| FW  || 14 || align=left| Dominique Badji || 2 || 0 || 0 || 2
|-
| DF || 24 || align=left| Tyler Blackett || 2 || 0 || 0 || 2
|-
| rowspan="6"|14 || MF || 8 || align=left| Allan Cruz || 1 || 0 || 0 || 1
|-
| FW || 11 ||  align=left| Sergio Santos || 0 || 1 || 0 || 1
|-
| FW || 12 ||  align=left| Calvin Harris || 1 || 0 || 0 || 1
|-
| DF || 20 || align=left| Geoff Cameron || 1 || 0 || 0 || 1
|-
| DF || 20 || align=left| Matt Miazga || 1 || 0 || 0 || 1
|-
| MF || 93 || align=left| Júnior Moreno || 1 || 0 || 0 || 1
|-
!colspan="4"|Total
!68!!2!!2!!72

Disciplinary record 
{| class="wikitable" style="font-size: 100%; text-align:center;"
|-
| rowspan="2" !width=15|
| rowspan="2" !width=15|
| rowspan="2" !width=120|Player
| colspan="3"|MLS
| colspan="3"|MLS Cup
| colspan="3"|USOC
| colspan="3"|Total
|-
!width=34; background:#fe9;|
!width=34; background:#fe9;|
!width=34; background:#ff8888;|
!width=34; background:#fe9;|
!width=34; background:#fe9;|
!width=34; background:#ff8888;|
!width=34; background:#fe9;|
!width=34; background:#fe9;|
!width=34; background:#ff8888;|
!width=34; background:#fe9;|
!width=34; background:#fe9;|
!width=34; background:#ff8888;|
|-
|| 5 || MF ||align=left| Obinna Nwobodo|| 10 || 0 || 0 || 0 || 0 || 0 || 0 || 0 || 0 || 10 || 0 || 0
|-
|| 4 || DF ||align=left| Nick Hagglund || 6 || 1 || 0 || 2 || 0 || 0 || 1 || 0 || 0 || 9 || 1 || 0
|-
|| 24 || DF ||align=left| Tyler Blackett || 8 || 0 || 0 || 0 || 0 || 0 || 0 || 0 || 0 || 8 || 0 || 0
|-
|| 10 || MF ||align=left| Luciano Acosta || 7 || 0 || 1 || 0 || 0 || 0 || 0 || 0 || 0 || 7 || 0 || 1
|-
|| 20 || DF ||align=left| Geoff Cameron || 6 || 0 || 0 || 0 || 0 || 0 || 0 || 0 || 0 || 6 || 0 || 0
|-
|| 7 || MF ||align=left| Yuya Kubo || 5 || 0 || 0 || 0 || 0 || 0 || 0 || 0 || 0 || 5 || 0 || 0
|-
|| 31 || MF ||align=left| Álvaro Barreal || 5 || 0 || 0 || 0 || 0 || 0 || 0 || 0 || 0 || 5 || 0 || 0
|-
|| 93 || MF ||align=left| Júnior Moreno || 5 || 0 || 0 || 0 || 0 || 0 || 0 || 0 || 0 || 5 || 0 || 0
|-
|| 2 || DF ||align=left| Alvas Powell || 4 || 0 || 0 || 0 || 0 || 0 || 0 || 0 || 0 || 4 || 0 || 0
|-
| 21 || DF ||align=left| Matt Miazga || 2 || 0 || 0 || 2 || 0 || 0 || 0 || 0 || 0 || 4 || 0 || 0
|-
|| 8 || MF ||align=left| Allan Cruz || 3 || 1 || 0 || 0 || 0 || 0 || 0 || 0 || 0 || 3 || 1 || 0
|-
|| 9 || FW ||align=left| Brenner || 3 || 0 || 0 || 0 || 0 || 0 || 0 || 0 || 0 || 3 || 0 || 0
|-
|| 14 || FW ||align=left| Dominique Badji || 3 || 0 || 0 || 0 || 0 || 0 || 0 || 0 || 0 || 3 || 0 || 0
|-
|| 1 || GK ||align=left| Alec Kann || 2 || 0 || 0 || 0 || 0 || 0 || 0 || 0 || 0 || 2 || 0 || 0
|-
|| 6 || MF ||align=left| Haris Medunjanin || 1 || 0 || 0 || 0 || 0 || 0 || 1 || 0 || 0 || 2 || 0 || 0
|-
|| 28 || DF ||align=left| Ray Gaddis || 1 || 0 || 0 || 1 || 0 || 0 || 0 || 0 || 0 || 2 || 0 || 0
|-
|| 3 || DF ||align=left| John Nelson || 1 || 0 || 0 || 0 || 0 || 0 || 0 || 0 || 0 || 1 || 0 || 0
|-
|| 12 || FW ||align=left| Calvin Harris || 1 || 0 || 0 || 0 || 0 || 0 || 0 || 0 || 0 || 1 || 0 || 0
|-
|| 16 || DF ||align=left| Zico Bailey || 0 || 0 || 0 || 0 || 0 || 0 || 1 || 0 || 0 || 1 || 0 || 0
|-
|| 19 || FW ||align=left| Brandon Vazquez || 1 || 0 || 0 || 0 || 0 || 0 || 0 || 0 || 0 || 1 || 0 || 0
|-
|| 22 || DF ||align=left| Rónald Matarrita || 1 || 0 || 0 || 0 || 0 || 0 || 0 || 0 || 0 || 1 || 0 || 0
|-
|| 11 || FW ||align=left| Sergio Santos || 0 || 0 || 1 || 1 || 0 || 0 || 0 || 0 || 0 || 1 || 0 || 1
|-
!colspan=3|Total !!75!!2!!2!!4!!0!!0!!3!!0!!0!!82!!2!!2

Clean sheets
{| class="wikitable sortable" style="text-align: center;"
|-
! style="background:#003087; color:#FFFFFF; border:2px solid #FE5000; width:35px;" scope="col"|No.
! style="background:#003087; color:#FFFFFF; border:2px solid #FE5000; width:130px;" scope="col"|Name
! style="background:#003087; color:#FFFFFF; border:2px solid #FE5000; width:50px;" scope="col"|
! style="background:#003087; color:#FFFFFF; border:2px solid #FE5000; width:50px;" scope="col"|
! style="background:#003087; color:#FFFFFF; border:2px solid #FE5000; width:50px;" scope="col"|
! style="background:#003087; color:#FFFFFF; border:2px solid #FE5000; width:50px;" scope="col"|Total
! style="background:#003087; color:#FFFFFF; border:2px solid #FE5000; width:50px;" scope="col"|Games
|-
| 18 ||align=left|  Roman Celentano || 5 || 0 || 1 || 6 || 29
|-
| 1 ||align=left|  Alec Kann || 1 || 0 || 0 || 1 || 7
|-

Awards

MLS Team of the Week

MLS Player of the Week

MLS Player of the Month

MLS All-Star

See also 
 2022 FC Cincinnati 2 season

References 

2022 Major League Soccer season
Cincinnati
FC Cincinnati
2022